Marys Creek may refer to:

 Marys Creek, Queensland, a rural locality in the Gympie Region, Queensland, Australia
 Marys Creek (Haw River tributary), a 3rd order tributary to the Haw River, in Alamance County, North Carolina, United States
 Mary Creek, a creek in the Cariboo region of British Columbia, Canada